Desperate Measures is the first live album by American rap rock band Hollywood Undead. The album was released on November 10, 2009, through A&M Records and Octone Records. The album includes three new songs, three cover songs, a remix of "Everywhere I Go", and six live versions of previously released tracks from a concert in Albuquerque, New Mexico along with a 60-minute DVD of live performances. The album debuted at No. 29 on the Billboard 200, No. 10 on Top Rock Albums, and No. 15 on Top Digital Albums.

Track listing

Disc One (CD)

Notes

Disc Two (DVD)
Live at the Sunshine Theater, Albuquerque, New Mexico and the Marquee Theater, Tempe, Arizona.  The concert footage is bracketed by "interlude" segments of audience interaction, as well as interview and behind-the-scenes footage, much of it black-and-white, between many of the songs.

Personnel
Aron "Deuce" Erlichman – vocals, bass guitar, keyboards, production, mixing, mastering
Jordon "Charlie Scene" Terrell – vocals, lead guitar
Jorel "J-Dog" Decker – vocals, rhythm guitar, bass guitar, keyboards, synthesizers, programming
George "Johnny 3 Tears" Ragan – vocals
Dylan "Funny Man" Alvarez – vocals
Matthew "Da Kurlzz" Busek – vocals, drums, percussion

Additional musicians
Glendon "Biscuitz" Crain – drums

Additional personnel
Danny Lohner, Don Gilmore, Kevin Shirley, Ben Grosse and Jon Kaplan – production, mixing, mastering

Charts

References

2009 albums
Hollywood Undead albums
Albums produced by Danny Lohner